Veronica Ruiz (born 23 January 1989) was a Spanish group rhythmic gymnast. She represents her nation at international competitions.

She participated at the 2008 Summer Olympics in Beijing. She also competed at world championships, including at the 2007 World Rhythmic Gymnastics Championships.

References

External links

https://www.youtube.com/watch?v=KuPV2D8XLNA

1989 births
Living people
Spanish rhythmic gymnasts
Place of birth missing (living people)
Gymnasts at the 2008 Summer Olympics
Olympic gymnasts of Spain
21st-century Spanish women